The  Miss Hawaii Teen USA competition is the pageant that selects the representative for the state of Hawaii in the Miss Teen USA pageant.

Although Hawaii has made the cut fewer times than many states, they have achieved a number of high placings. Hawaii Teen USAs have been quite successful at Miss Teen USA, and are ranked fifteenth in terms of number and value of placements  and were ranked third in the 1980s .  Kelly Hu won the competition in 1985 becoming the 3rd state that won the Miss Teen USA title for the first time and Kiilani Arruda won in 2020 becoming the 38th Miss Teen USA titleholder, while two other Hawaii teens have placed as first runner-up.

Kelly Hu was the first Hawaii teen to cross over to Miss Hawaii USA, and she was also the most successful. Only three other Teens have competed at Miss USA.

NoeLani Denisi of Kahului was crowned Miss Hawaii Teen USA 2023 on January 15, 2023 at the Hawaii Convention Center in Honolulu. She will represent Hawaii for the title of Miss Teen USA 2023.

Results summary

Placements
Miss Teen USA: Kelly Hu (1985), Kiʻilani Arruda (2020)
1st runners-up: Malia Yamamura (1984), Sonya Balmores (2004)
2nd runners-up: Mahana Walters (1997)
Top 6: Juliana Kaulukukui (1993)
Top 10: Camille Peraro (2003)
Top 15/16: Serena Karnagy (2007), Kathryn Teruya (2012), Samantha Neyland (2013), Malulani Paiste (2022)
Hawaii holds a record of 11 placements at Miss Teen USA.

Awards
Miss Congeniality: Juliana Kaulukukui (1993), Ashley Moser (2009)
Miss Photogenic: Courtney Coleman (2011)

Winners 

1 Age at the time of the Miss Teen USA pageant

References

External links
Official website

Hawaii
Women in Hawaii